was a professional wrestling event promoted by World Wonder Ring Stardom. The event took place on August 26, 2022, in Tokyo, Japan at the Shinagawa Intercity Hall, with a limited attendance due in part to the ongoing COVID-19 pandemic at the time.

Background
The "New Blood" is a series of events which mainly focus on matches where rookie wrestlers, usually with three or less years of in-ring experience, evolve. Besides wrestlers from Stardom, various superstars from multiple promotions of the Japanese independent scene are invited to compete in bouts that are usually going under the stipulation of singles or tag team matches.

The show featured seven professional wrestling matches that resulted from scripted storylines, where wrestlers portrayed villains, heroes, or less distinguishable characters in the scripted events that built tension and culminated in a wrestling match or series of matches. The event's press conference took place on August 3, 2022, and was broadcast live on Stardom's YouTube channel.

Event
The entire event was broadcast live on Stardom's YouTube channel. In the first match, JTO's Tomoka Inaba picked up a victory over Queen's Quest's Hina. In the second match, Oedo Tai's Ruaka defeated Lady C and Gatoh Move Pro Wrestling's Chie Koishikawa in a three-way match. The third match saw Ram Kaicho & Rina defeating Momoka Hanazono & Waka Tsukiyama. After the match, Kaicho challenged AZM for the High Speed Championship at the next New Blood event. Hanazono also stepped up to the challenge to make it a three-way match. The fourth match saw Mai Sakurai & Linda defeating Stars' Saya Iida & Momo Kohgo. The fifth match saw God's Eye's (Mirai & Ami Sourei) defeating Starlight Kid & Haruka Umesaki via disqualification when Umesaki assaulted Mirai with a steel chair in front of the referee. After the match, Oedo Tai attacked God's Eye until Tomoka Inaba came to the ring for the save. Syuri and Inaba then shook hands as Inaba became the newest member of God's Eye. The sixth match saw Hanan successfully defending the Future of Stardom Championship for the tenth time in a row against Aoi. After the match, Ami Sourei challenged Hanan for the Future of Stardom Championship at the next New Blood event.

The show concluded with Tam Nakano defeating Miyu Amasaki in a singles match as the result of the main event.

Results

References

External links
Page Stardom World

2022 in professional wrestling
2022 in Tokyo
World Wonder Ring Stardom shows
Professional wrestling in Tokyo
Women's professional wrestling shows
World Wonder Ring Stardom